José Simeón Cañas Central American University, also known as UCA El Salvador, is a private Catholic university with nonprofit purposes in San Salvador, El Salvador. It is operated by the Society of Jesus.

UCA was founded on September 15, 1965, at the request of a group of Catholic families who appealed to the Salvadoran government and the Society of Jesus in order to create a university as an alternative to the University of El Salvador, becoming the first private institution of higher education in the country. The Jesuits also run Central American University in Nicaragua (UCA Managua), opened in 1960.

History
UCA has since evolved to be one of the best institutions of higher learning in Central America (Guatemala, El Salvador, Honduras, Nicaragua, Costa Rica and Panama). This is the case, despite the university's focus on playing a decisive role in the transformation of the unjust Salvadoran society. Such a focus within the Salvadoran context has driven the university to give priority to undergraduate degrees, research within the social sciences, and popular presentation of research results ("social projectionl") in local peer-reviewed journals.

In the 1970s and 1980s, during the Civil War in El Salvador, UCA was known as the home of several internationally recognized Jesuit scholars and intellectuals, including Jon Sobrino, Ignacio Ellacuría, Ignacio Martín-Baró, and Segundo Montes.  They were outspoken against the abuses of the Salvadoran military and government, and carried out research to demonstrate the effects of the war and poverty in the country. The extreme social conditions in El Salvador provided a very rich empirical basis for innovative research within sociology, social anthropology, philosophy, social psychology, and theology. These scholars made important and lasting contributions within these fields.  Ellacuría, Martín-Baró and Segundo Montes, along with three other Jesuit professors, their housekeeper, and her daughter, were murdered by the Salvadoran Armed forces on November 16, 1989, in one of the most notorious episodes from the Civil War (see Murder of UCA scholars).

Campus
The university is located at Antiguo Cuscatlán. The university campus has 38 acres (16 ha) with 33 buildings, a professional soccer field, basketball and volleyball courts, as well as three auditoriums and four cafeterias. The campus also includes a minimarket, a museum, three clinics, a book shop, a main library, several smaller thematic libraries, and a documentation center.

Faculties
 Faculty of Economics and Business Sciences
 Faculty of Human and Social Sciences
 Faculty of Engineering and Architecture

Academic departments

 Department of Mathematics
 Department of Business Administration
 Department of Judicial Sciences
 Department of Sociology and Political Science
 Department of Economics
 Department of Accounting and Finance
 Department of Psychology
 Department of Philosophy
 Department of Theology
 Department of Educational Sciences
 Department of Communications and Culture
 Department of Public Health
 Department of Operations and Systems
 Department of Electronics and Informatics
 Department of Energy and Fluid Sciences
 Department of Structural Mechanics
 Department of Spatial Organization
 Department of Engineering Process and Environmental Science

Social projection
 UCA Audiovisuals
 YSUCA 91.7 FM Radio
 Monseñor Romero Center
 University's Public Opinion Institute - IUDOP
 University's Human Rights Institute - IDHUCA

Academics

Undergraduate programs

 Architecture
 Civil Engineering
 Electrical Engineering
 Mechanical Engineering
 Industrial Engineering
 Chemical Engineering
 Food Engineering
 Energetic Engineering
 Computing Engineering
 Technician in Marketing
 Technician in Accounting
 Licenciate in Philosophy
 Licenciate in Theology
 Licenciate in Psychology
 Licenciate in Economics
 Licenciate in Marketing
 Licenciate in Public Accounting
 Licenciate in Business Administration
 Licenciate in Agribusiness Administration
 Licenciate in Judicial Sciences
 Licenciate in Social Communications
 Professorate of Theology
 Professorate of Special Education
 Professorate of Preschool Education
 Professorate of Basic Education (1st & 2nd Cycles)
 Professorate of English Language (3rd Cycle Basic and Middle Education)

Postgraduate programs

 Master in Iberoamerican Philosophy
 Master in Social Sciences
 Master in Political Sciences
 Master in Latin American Theology
 Master in Local Development
 Master in Criminal Constitutional Law
 Master in Applied Statistics to Investigation
 Master in Environmental Management
 Master in Industrial Maintenance Management
 Master in Public Health
 Master in Communitarian Psychology
 Master in Educational Evaluation and Politics
 Master in Communications
 Master in Finance
 Master in Financial Audit
 Master in Business Law
 Master in Business Administration
 Doctorate in Iberoamerican Philosophy
 Doctorate in Social Sciences

See also

 Education in El Salvador
 List of Jesuit sites
 List of universities in El Salvador
 José Simeón Cañas

References

Official website 

 
Universities in El Salvador
Jesuit universities and colleges
Educational institutions established in 1965
San Salvador
1965 establishments in El Salvador